Bernard Atwell McKinney, later Kiane Zawadi (born November 26, 1932) is an American jazz trombonist and euphonium player, one of the few jazz soloists on the latter instrument.

Biography

McKinney was born into a family of ten children, several of whom also became musicians. He is the uncle of R&B producer and jazz pianist Carlos "Los Da Mystro" McKinney. He first worked with Barry Harris and Sonny Stitt in 1951, and played with Alvin Jackson's band early in the decade. Toward the middle of the 1950s he was with Art Blakey, and he moved with Yusef Lateef to New York City in 1959. In the 1960s he played with Illinois Jacquet, James Moody, and Curtis Fuller. Later that decade he adopted the name Kiane Zawadi. In the 1970s he performed with Archie Shepp, Carlos Garnett, Harold Vick, Frank Foster, Charles Tolliver, Abdullah Ibrahim, and McCoy Tyner. In 1978, he played in the pit orchestra for Dancin', a Broadway show. He appeared at a Charlie Parker tribute at Town Hall in New York City in 1985.

Other musicians Zawadi worked with include Mongo Santamaría, Dizzy Gillespie, Clark Terry, Joe Henderson, and Aretha Franklin.

Discography

As sideman
With Frank Foster
 1968 Manhattan Fever
 1978 Shiny Stockings

With Slide Hampton
Slide Hampton and His Horn of Plenty (Strand, 1959)
Sister Salvation (Atlantic, 1960)

With Freddie Hubbard
 1962 Ready for Freddie (Blue Note)
 1966 Blue Spirits (Blue Note)
 1967 High Blues Pressure

With Clifford Jordan
 1991 Down Through the Years (Milestone)
 1997 Play What You Feel (Mapleshade)

With Yusef Lateef
The Dreamer (Savoy, 1959)
The Fabric of Jazz (Savoy, 1959)

With others
 1955 Byrd Jazz Donald Byrd
 1957 The Cool Sound of Pepper Adams, Pepper Adams
 1961 Cookin' the Blues, James Moody
 1961 The Futuristic Sounds of Sun Ra, Sun Ra
 1966 A Slice of the Top, Hank Mobley
 1966 Cookin' Time, Howard McGhee
 1968 My People, Freddie Roach
 1972 Attica Blues, Archie Shepp
 1972 Willis Jackson Recording Session, Willis "Gator" Jackson
 1973 African Space Program, Dollar Brand
 1973 Song of the New World, McCoy Tyner
 1974 Another Beginning, Les McCann (Atlantic)
 1974 One for Me, Shirley Scott
 1974 Your Baby Is a Lady, Jackie DeShannon
 1974 Don't Look Back, Harold Vick
 1975 Impact, Charles Tolliver (Strata-East)
 1975 Let This Melody Ring On, Carlos Garnett (Muse) 
 1975 Vance 32, Kenny Vance
 1976 Sound of a Drum, Ralph MacDonald
 1977 Phyllis Hyman, Phyllis Hyman
 1977 Saturday Night Fever, Cornell Dupree
 1978 Easy, Grant Green (Versatile)
 1982 Sentimental Mood, Mickey Bass
 1988 Jacquet's Got It!, Illinois Jacquet
 1995 Last Chance for Common Sense, Rodney Kendrick
 1996 Big Band, Joe Henderson
 1998 Live in Harlem, Patience Higgins

References

[ Kiane Zawadi] at Allmusic

1932 births
Living people
American jazz trombonists
Male trombonists
20th-century trombonists
20th-century American male musicians
American male jazz musicians
20th-century American musicians